PA System is a collaboration between Alexa Hatanaka and Patrick Thompson. They are known for large murals in Canadian cities as well as the application of mural techniques onto a large ice wall on Baffin Island.  This collaboration with young Inuit artists Parr Etidloie and Audi Qinnuayuak was documented in a movie. 

As PA System, they have founded the Embassy of Imagination (EOI), a multidisciplinary arts initiative for youth based in Cape Dorset ( ᑭᙵᐃᑦ, Kinngait), Nunavut.

References

External links 
PA System official website
Embassy of Imagination official website

Living people
Canadian artist groups and collectives
Canadian muralists
Year of birth missing (living people)
21st-century Canadian artists